Mohammad Iqbal Azizi is an ethnic Pashtun politician in Afghanistan, who served as Governor of Laghman from March 2010 to September 2012. He previously served as head of the Education Department in Nangarhar Province.

Early life
Azizi was born into a well-known Pashtun family in Afghanistan. He belongs to the Azizi tribe, sub-clan of the influential Kheshgi Afghans.

References

External links

Governors of Laghman Province
Pashtun people
Living people
Afghan Millat Party politicians
Year of birth missing (living people)